The 2009–10 CEV Champions League was the 51st edition of the highest level European volleyball club competition organised by the European Volleyball Confederation.

Participating teams

League round
24 teams will be drawn to 6 pools of 4 teams each.
The 1st – 2nd ranked will qualify for the Playoffs 12.
The organizer of the Final Four will be determined after the end of the League Round and qualifies directly for the Final Four.
The team of the organizer of  the Final Four will be replaced by the 3rd ranked team with the best score.
The four next  3rd ranked  teams  move to CEV Cup. The remaining teams are eliminated.

Pool A

|}

Pool B

|}

Pool C

|}

Pool D

|}

Pool E

|}

Pool F

|}

Playoffs

Playoffs 12

|}

First leg

|}

Second leg

|}

Playoffs 6

|}

First leg

 
|}

Second leg

|}

Final Four
Organizer:  PGE Skra Bełchatów
 Place: Łódź
All times are Central European Summer Time (UTC+02:00).
The tournament was originally scheduled to be held on 10–11 April 2010, but was postponed because of the national mourning for President Lech Kaczyński and other Polish dignitaries who perished in the Smolensk air disaster.

Semifinals

|}

3rd place match

|}

Final

|}

Final standings

Awards

Most Valuable Player
  Osmany Juantorena (Trentino BetClic)
Best Scorer
  Mariusz Wlazły (PGE Skra Bełchatów)
Best Spiker
  Dante Amaral (Dynamo Moscow)
Best Server
  Osmany Juantorena (Trentino BetClic)

Best Blocker
  Matevž Kamnik (ACH Volley Bled)
Best Receiver
  Daniel Lewis (ACH Volley Bled)
Best Libero
  Andrea Bari (Trentino BetClic)
Best Setter
  Łukasz Żygadło (Trentino BetClic)

External links
 2009/10 European Champions League

CEV Champions League
2009 in volleyball
2010 in volleyball